Piotr Piasecki (born 4 September 1952) is a Polish equestrian. He competed at the 1992 Summer Olympics and the 1996 Summer Olympics.

References

External links
 

1952 births
Living people
Polish male equestrians
Olympic equestrians of Poland
Equestrians at the 1992 Summer Olympics
Equestrians at the 1996 Summer Olympics
Sportspeople from Szczecin
20th-century Polish people